Coronium, also called newtonium, was the name of a suggested chemical element, hypothesised in the 19th century. The name, inspired by the solar corona, was given by Gruenwald in 1887. A new atomic thin green line in the solar corona was then considered to be emitted by a new element unlike anything else seen under laboratory conditions. It was later determined to be emitted by iron (Fe13+), so highly ionized that it was at that time impossible to produce in a laboratory.

Solar spectroscopy 
During the total solar eclipse of 7 August 1869, a green emission line of wavelength 530.3 nm was independently  observed by Charles Augustus Young (1834–1908) and William Harkness (1837–1903) in the coronal spectrum. Since this  line did not correspond to that of any known material, it was proposed that it was due to an unknown element, provisionally named coronium.

In 1902, in an attempt at a chemical conception of the aether, the Russian chemist and chemical educator Dmitri Mendeleev hypothesized that there existed two inert chemical elements of lesser atomic weight than hydrogen. Of these two, he thought the lighter to be an all-penetrating, all-pervasive gas, and the slightly heavier one to be coronium. Later he renamed coronium as newtonium.

It was not until the 1930s that Walter Grotrian and Bengt Edlén discovered that the spectral line at 530.3 nm was due to highly ionized iron (Fe13+); other unusual lines in the coronal spectrum were also caused by highly charged ions, such as nickel, the high ionization being due to the extreme temperature of the solar corona. The line at 530.3 nm had previously been misclassified as iron line number 1474.

See also
Helium
Nebulium
Spectroscopy

References

Further reading

External links

Misidentified chemical elements
Iron